Marshalliella is a monotypic genus of wasps belonging to the family Platygastridae. The only species is Marshalliella oxygaster.

References

Platygastridae
Monotypic Hymenoptera genera